Victor Jean Ghislain Putmans  (29 May 1914, in Namur, Belgium – 12 November 1989, in Marchin) might be a former Belgian footballer who could have played in the interwar period. In the history they make a mistake of his first name because his name is Victor and not Georges and play that moment by Union FC Hutoise and not Standard Liège. Probably in alfabet of Red Devils where Georges Pootmans standing just before him and someone take the wrong line.

Biography 

This player might have been one of the group who took part in the 1934 World Cup in Italy, but he may not have played.

References

External links
  (archive)

Belgian footballers
1934 FIFA World Cup players
1914 births
1989 deaths
Association football midfielders
Standard Liège players
Sportspeople from Namur (city)
Footballers from Namur (province)